The Hamburg Institute for Social Research is an independent private foundation whose scholarship is focused on both contemporary history and the social sciences. Founded in 1984 by Jan Philipp Reemtsma, it currently employs about 50 people with roughly 50% working in the research fields of sociology and history. The institute publishes a bimonthly journal called  and has its own publishing house.

Mittelweg 36
The institutes journal was first published in 1992 and allows readers to follow ongoing research projects at the institute.
In its first decade the journal has garnered interest not only in the academic community but also has a number of non-academic readers.

Wehrmachtsausstellung
In 1995 the institute began an exhibition titled Wehrmachtsausstellung which toured Germany until 1999. The tour detailed the War crimes of the Wehrmacht and helped break the Myth of the clean Wehrmacht in Germany. It was designed by Hannes Heer.

References

Bibliography

 Bartov, Omer (2003) Germany's war and the Holocaust: disputed histories Cornell University Press 
 Bankier, David. Mikhman, Dan. (2009) Holocaust Historiography in Context: Emergence, Challenges, Polemics and Achievements Berghahn Books

External links
  

Social science institutes
Research institutes in Germany
Education in Hamburg